Rūdiškės is a city in the Trakai district municipality, Lithuania about 15 km south of Trakai.

During the interwar period it was part of the Second Polish Republic.

Until 2003 FK Vėtra was based in Rūdiškės. In 2003 FK Vėtra won bronze medals in the elite division and reached LFF Cup finals and the same year it was relocated to Vilnius. Now the city has its FK Rūdiškės football club.

Population
In 2011, the city had a population of 2300: Lithuanians - 50,83% (1169), Poles - 36,17% (832), Russians - 8,52% (196), Belarusians - 2,26% (52), Ukrainians - 0,7% (16), others - 1,52% (35).

Sister cities
Zalewo, Poland

References

Cities in Vilnius County
Cities in Lithuania
Troksky Uyezd
Wilno Voivodeship (1926–1939)
Trakai District Municipality